Vitéz István Horthy de Nagybánya (9 December 1904 – 20 August 1942) was Hungarian regent Admiral Miklós Horthy's eldest son, a politician, and, during World War II, a fighter pilot.

Biography

In his youth, István Horthy and his younger brother Miklós Jr. were active members of a Catholic Scout troop of the Hungarian Scout Association (Magyar Cserkészszövetség), although he was a Protestant.
Horthy graduated as a mechanical engineer in 1928. He went to the United States for one year and worked in the Ford factory in Detroit, Michigan.

Returning to the Kingdom of Hungary, he worked in MÁVAG's locomotive factory in this occupation. On the forefront of the designer team, he took part in the development of many great projects, such as the Locomotive 424. Between 1934 and 1938, Horthy was director of the company and after 1938 he became its general manager. In 1940, he married Countess Ilona Edelsheim-Gyulai. 

He strenuously confronted Nazism, and often made his criticism public. In January 1942, he had been elected Deputy Regent, and for some time, the "small regent" enjoyed massive popularity in Hungary. Shortly thereafter, István was sent to the Eastern Front. His humanity, and his disagreement in the "Jewish Question" appears even here, too –  a quote from one of his letters, which he sent to his father from Kiev: "[...] Yet another sad topic: the Jewish companies, as I hear, -there 20 or 30,000 [men]-, are at the mercy of the sadist's passions, in every regard; the stomach of man gets ache [looking at this]; it is abhorrent, that in the 20th century, it happens at us, too... [...] I fear, we will pay for this very dearly once. (Is it possible to take them home to work there?) Otherwise, in spring, only a few will be alive. [...]"

István Horthy died in Russia, shortly after his arrival, in a much publicized flying accident. He was then serving in the Royal Hungarian Air Force (Magyar Királyi Honvéd Légierő), MKHL, with the rank of 1/Lt, as a fighter pilot. His unit, 1/3 Fighter Squadron, was supporting the Hungarian Second Army against Soviet forces. He was flying his MÁVAG Héja ("Hawk"), V.421, a Hungarian fighter based on the Italian Reggiane Re.2000. During his 25th operational sortie, soon after takeoff from an air field near Ilovskoye, the other pilot, flying with him, asked Horthy to increase height. István pulled up rapidly. His aircraft (that had become much more prone to stalls, after a steel plate was added behind the cockpit of all Reggianes, to protect pilots, but so shifting the plane's center of gravity) stalled and crashed. It was 20 August 1942 (18 August, according to other authors).

His only son, Sharif István Horthy, is a successful engineer.

Honors

Hungary honoured István Horthy by issuing a commemorative postage-stamp on 15 October 1942.

References

Notes
 
Bibliography

 Neulen, Hans Werner. In the skies of Europe: Air Forces Allied to the Luftwaffe 1939–1945. Ramsbury, Marlborough, UK: The Crowood Press, 2000. 
 Punka, Gӳorge. Hungarian Aces of World War 2. Osprey Publishing, Oxford, England, 2002. .
 

1904 births
1942 deaths
People from Pula
Hungarian politicians
Aviators killed in aviation accidents or incidents
Hungarian nobility
Hungarian military personnel of World War II
Hungarian World War II pilots
Hungarian military personnel killed in World War II
Istvan I
Victims of aviation accidents or incidents in 1942
Victims of aviation accidents or incidents in the Soviet Union
Hungarian national conservatives